Gunter Hampel (born 31 August 1937) is a German jazz vibraphonist, clarinettist, saxophonist, flautist, pianist, and composer. He became dedicated to free jazz in the 1960s, developing a record label (Birth Records) and working with Jeanne Lee,  John McLaughlin, Muruga Booker, Laurie Allan, Udo Lindenberg, Pierre Courbois, Archie Shepp, Marion Brown, Steve McCall and Perry Robinson. In 1972, he formed the Galaxie Dream Band.

Discography
 Heartplants (SABA, 1965)
 Music from Europe (ESP, 1968)
 The 8th of July 1969 (Birth, 1969)
 Dances (Paris 1969) (Birth, 1969)
 Espace with Boulou Ferre (Birth, 1970)
 Spirits (Birth, 1971)
 Out of New York (MPS/BASF, 1971)
 Ballet-Symphony No. 5, Symphony No. 6 (Birth, 1971)
 Broadway/Folksong (Birth, 1972)
 Angel (Birth, 1972)
 Waltz for 3 Universes in a Corridor (Birth, 1972)
 I Love Being with You (Birth, 1972)
 Unity Dance (Birth, 1973)
 Journey to the Song Within (Birth, 1974)
 Celebrations (Birth, 1974)
 Ruomi (Birth, 1974)
 Out from Under (Birth, 1974)
 Cosmic Dancer (Birth, 1975)
 Enfant Terrible (Birth, 1975)
 Transformation (Birth, 1976)
 Vogelfrei (Birth, 1976)
 All Is Real (Birth, 1978)
 That Came Down on Me (Birth, 1978)
 Flying Carpet (Kharma, 1978)
 Reeds 'n' Vibes with Marion Brown (Improvising Artists, 1978)
 Freedom of the Universe with Jeanne Lee (Birth, 1979)
 Oasis with Jeanne Lee (Horo, 1979)
 All the Things You Could Be If Charles Mingus Was Your Daddy (Birth, 1980)
 Wellen/Waves (FMP, 1980)
 Life on This Planet (Birth, 1981)
 A Place to Be with Us (Birth, 1981)
 Companion (Birth, 1982)
 Gemini (Birth, 1983)
 Jubilation (Birth, 1985)
 Dialog with Matthias Schubert (Birth, 1992)
 Time Is Now (Birth, 1992)
 Celestial Glory (Birth, 1992)
 Next Generation (Birth, 1995)
 Koln Concert One (Birth, 1997)
 Koln Concert Part 2 (Birth, 1997)
 Solid Fun with Christian Weidner (Birth, 1998)
 The 8th of September (Birth, 1999)
 Survivor (Birth, 2001)
 Earthlings (Birth, 2001)
 The Way Out (Birth, 2003)
 Zeitgeist (Birth, 2006)
 Celestial Travellin'...and Other Ways to Get Around (Birth, 2006)
 Stellar Dust (Birth, 2008)
 Vibes Vibes (Birth, 2009)
 Lifer (Birth, 2009)
 Solo Concert - Brandenburg Concerto (Birth, 2012)
 Holy Lights + Human Rights (Birth, 2014)
 Fukushima (Birth, 2014)
 Psychedelic Lullaby for Artificial Babies (Birth, 2014)
 Bounce (Intuition 2017)

References

External links
 – official site

Avant-garde jazz musicians
German jazz vibraphonists
German jazz saxophonists
Male saxophonists
German jazz clarinetists
German jazz flautists
German jazz pianists
1937 births
Living people
ESP-Disk artists
21st-century saxophonists
20th-century German male pianists
21st-century German male pianists
21st-century clarinetists
German male jazz musicians
Globe Unity Orchestra members
Clarinet Contrast members
Improvising Artists Records artists
20th-century flautists
21st-century flautists